Amelin may refer to the following places in Poland and Russia:

Amelin, Łódź Voivodeship (central Poland)
Amelin, Lubartów County in Lublin Voivodeship (eastern Poland)
Amelin, Parczew County in Lublin Voivodeship (eastern Poland)
Amelin, Masovian Voivodeship (eastern-central Poland)
Amelin, Kursk Oblast (western Russia)

It may also refer to:
Amelin (surname)